Riqqa is an area in the south of Kuwait City, in Ahmadi Governorate in Kuwait. In 2007 it had a population of 56,554.

Populated places in Kuwait